The 2013–14 Lithuanian Football Cup is the twenty-fifth season of the Lithuanian annual football knock-out tournament. The competition started on 4 June 2013 with the matches of the first round and is scheduled to end in May 2014. Žalgiris are the defending champions.

The winners will qualify for the first qualifying round of the 2014–15 UEFA Europa League.

First round 
The matches started on 4 June 2013 and ended on 6 July 2013.

!colspan="3" align="center"|4 June

|-
!colspan="3" align="center"|8 June

|-
!colspan="3" align="center"|13 June

|-
!colspan="3" align="center"|14 June

|-
!colspan="3" align="center"|15 June

|-
!colspan="3" align="center"|21 June

|-
!colspan="3" align="center"|23 June

|-
!colspan="3" align="center"|25 June

|-
!colspan="3" align="center"|26 June

|-
!colspan="3" align="center"|27 June

|-
!colspan="3" align="center"|28 June

|-
!colspan="3" align="center"|29 June

|-
!colspan="3" align="center"|30 June

|-
!colspan="3" align="center"|5 July

|-
!colspan="3" align="center"|6 July

|}

Second round 
The matches started on 8 August 2013 and ended on 31 August 2013.

|-
!colspan="3" align="center"|8 August

|-
!colspan="3" align="center"|15 August

|-
!colspan="3" align="center"|19 August

|-
!colspan="3" align="center"|20 August

|-
!colspan="3" align="center"|30 August

|-
!colspan="3" align="center"|31 August

|}

Third round 
The matches started on 24 September 2013 and ended on 25 September 2013.

|-
!colspan="3" align="center"|24 September

|-
!colspan="3" align="center"|25 September

|}

Fourth round 
The matches started on 1, 2 & 16 October 2013.

|-
!colspan="3" align="center"|1 October

|-
!colspan="3" align="center"|2 October

|-
!colspan="3" align="center"|16 October

|}

Quarter-final 
This round of the competition is to be played over two-legs. The eight winners from the previous round compete at this stage.

|}

First legs

Second legs

Semi-final 
This round of the competition is to be played over two-legs. The four winners from the previous round compete at this stage.

|}

First legs

Second legs

Final

References

External links

Cup
Cup
2013–14 domestic association football cups
2013-14